Jean-Jacques Etamé (born 23 November 1966 in Strasbourg, France) is a French-born Cameroonian former professional football midfielder who played 174 times in Ligue 1 between 1985 and 1998, playing for Strasbourg, Lille, Cannes, Bastia and Caen. Etamé also had two caps for Cameroon.

References

External links
 
 

Living people
1966 births
Footballers from Strasbourg
Association football midfielders
Cameroonian footballers
Cameroon international footballers
French footballers
French sportspeople of Cameroonian descent
Citizens of Cameroon through descent
RC Strasbourg Alsace players
Stade Brestois 29 players
SC Abbeville players
Lille OSC players
Stade Malherbe Caen players
AS Cannes players
SC Bastia players
ASPV Strasbourg players
Cameroonian expatriate footballers
Cameroonian expatriate sportspeople in France
Expatriate footballers in France